Achnasaul is a village, located on the shores of Loch Arkaig, close to  Spean Bridge, Inverness-shire, Scotland, within the Scottish council area of Highland.

References

Populated places in Lochaber